Different Time Zones is the fifth studio album by Irish ambient musician Seamus Ó Muíneacháin.

Background and release

O'Muineachain wrote the album while living in the Czech Republic. The album was released on January 7, 2022, through Ghost Home Recordings. Tracks from the album were broadcast by RTÉ Raidió na Gaeltachta, KEXP, and KXCI. Music videos were produced for the tracks "Over", "Summer Lightning", and "Dogwood".

Critical Reception

Writing for Business Post, Tony Clayton-Lea opined, "O'Muineachain has graduated from ingénue to skilled practitioner, fusing found sounds with beautifully drifting intrumental pieces primarily influenced by rural Irish landscapes."
Foxy Digitalis opined that; "These pieces feel like they could fall apart at any moment; a sonic house of cards that is improbable and magnetic."

Track listing

References

External links
 Different Time Zones on Bandcamp

Jimmy Monaghan albums
2022 albums